John Martin Skoglund, "Doverstorparen", (2 September 1892  in Risinge, Östergötland- 6 December 1976 in Norrköping) was a Swedish politician and member of the Moderate Party.

Skoglund was the son of Karl Jonas Skoglund  and his wife Stina Lisa Olofsdotter. Between 1911 and 1912, he studied at a folkhögskola and lantmannaskola and at an early age got to work and lived at a farm in Doverstorp. In 1917, he married the farmers daughter Elsa Andersson with whom she got two children.

In 1919, Skoglund was elected into the Risinge municipal council and was soon one of the leading men of the council. In 1923 to 1928, he was the chairman of the fattigvårdsstyrelsen. In 1928, he was a candidate for the second chamber election and was elected thanks to Moderate Partys  Arvid Lindmans victorious election in late 1928.

In Riksdagen Skoglund profiled himself as a right socialpolitician expert and was hired as responsible for socialpolitics decisions. Other questions that interested him was farming, defence and taxes.

He retired in 1960 from the Riksdagen.

References

1892 births
1976 deaths
People from Finspång Municipality
Moderate Party politicians
Members of the Andra kammaren